Edgar Hay (14 December 1863 – 19 December 1949) was Archdeacon of Barnstaple from 1935 to 1945.

He was educated at St Paul's and Corpus Christi College, Cambridge. He was ordained in 1887  and held incumbencies at Carlton Colville, Plymtree and Exeter.

Notes

1863 births
People educated at St Paul's School, London
Alumni of Corpus Christi College, Cambridge
Archdeacons of Barnstaple
1949 deaths